Bally Sports Southeast (BSSE) (originally named SportSouth from its inception until October 4, 2015, and Fox Sports Southeast (FSSE) until March 31, 2021) is an American regional sports network owned by Diamond Sports Group, a joint venture between Sinclair Broadcast Group and Entertainment Studios, and operates as an affiliate of Bally Sports. Headquartered in Atlanta, Georgia, the channel broadcasts regional coverage of sports events throughout the southeastern United States, with a focus on professional sports teams based in Atlanta, Tennessee, and Charlotte.

Bally Sports Southeast is available on cable providers throughout Georgia, Tennessee, Alabama, Mississippi, South Carolina and parts of North Carolina (roughly from Asheville to Charlotte); it is also available nationwide on satellite via DirecTV. The channel's programming reaches an estimated 8.9 million cable and satellite subscribers.

History
The channel traces its history to Turner South, a cable and satellite television channel that was launched on October 1, 1999, by the Turner Broadcasting System. It was the first regional entertainment network developed especially for viewers in the southern U.S., featuring a mix of movies, comedy and drama series, regional news updates, and unique original programming. The channel also carried coverage of professional sports events from the Atlanta Braves of Major League Baseball, the National Basketball Association's Atlanta Hawks, and the National Hockey League's Atlanta Thrashers, all of which were owned by Turner at the network's launch and the former two of which also aired in the Atlanta market and nationwide on Turner-owned TBS.

Turner Broadcasting/Time Warner restricted Turner South's distribution to its designated broadcast territory in the southeastern United States, with satellite providers that carried the channel being required to black out the channel in areas not covered by the ZIP codes in Turner South's coverage area.

News Corporation filed a lawsuit against Turner Broadcasting and its corporate parent Time Warner in a Georgia Superior Court on June 15, 1999, citing that the plans Turner had unveiled to carry sports events on Turner South violated a non-compete agreement that the two companies signed as part of News Corporation's $65 million purchase of the original SportSouth in 1996, which prohibited Turner from launching a regional sports network in the southeastern United States until 2008.

Sale to Fox Sports Networks
On February 23, 2006, Fox Sports Net's then-parent company News Corporation, looking to further expand its roster of sports teams and events, purchased Turner South for $375 million. The deal included all existing sports contracts, involving teams that sister network-to-be FSN South (now Bally Sports South) also held the regional cable television rights to broadcast.

After the deal was completed, FSN sought a new name for the channel, with network officials eventually chose to rebrand it as SportSouth, after coming up with about 60 different suggestions. The SportSouth name was originally used as the name for what is now Bally Sports South, which was founded by Turner Broadcasting in 1990 and was purchased by News Corporation's Fox Cable Networks unit in 1996, becoming a charter outlet of Fox Sports Net. Under Turner ownership, the original SportSouth carried Braves and Hawks games, as well as NBA games from the Charlotte Hornets, World Championship Wrestling events, college sports and some syndicated programs.

Turner South officially relaunched as SportSouth on October 13, 2006, becoming the 15th regional sports network owned as part of Fox Sports Net; the rebrand took place with its first official event broadcast: an NHL game between the Atlanta Thrashers and the Carolina Hurricanes. The relaunched channel dropped all non-sports entertainment programming, replacing it with other regionally produced programs and national sports news, documentary and magazine programming sourced by FSN. On-air promotions for SportSouth included sports figures native to the South such as Steve Spurrier, Bob Hartley, Bo Jackson and Heath Shuler.

Originally, the two networks only shared broadcast rights to Atlanta-based teams, while FSN South exclusively broadcast games from the NBA's Memphis Grizzlies, Major League Baseball's Baltimore Orioles and the NHL's Carolina Hurricanes and Nashville Predators. However, FSN South and SportSouth gradually began sharing rights to sports events from other teams during the late 2000s. In 2008, select Major League Baseball games from the Cincinnati Reds and St. Louis Cardinals were added to SportSouth's schedule (via sister network FSN Midwest), subject to league territorial restrictions. This ensures that both those teams and the Predators have the maximum number of games able to be televised.

In August 2007, News Corporation lifted SportSouth's regional blackout restrictions, allowing the channel to be carried nationwide by DirecTV on its "Sports Pack"; however, some professional sporting events are still subject to blackout restrictions imposed by the major sports leagues for national telecasts. On August 28 of that year, SportSouth acquired the television rights to Tennessee Volunteers sporting events, in a package that includes encore presentations of twelve football games, live telecasts of four men's basketball games, four women's basketball games and six Olympic sporting events, as well as rights to the team's coaches shows for the former three sports.

The Atlanta Braves' relationship with SportSouth and independent station WPCH-TV (channel 17) – which until October 2007, served as the local broadcast version of TBS – intersected in 2011, when sister network Fox Sports South began producing an annual package of Braves games for the station that were not broadcast by the two networks. On March 1, 2013, Fox Sports South and SportSouth announced that they would acquire the rights to the 45 games, ending the team's contract with WPCH-TV beginning with the 2013 season, marking the first season in 40 years that the team's game telecasts did not air in the Atlanta market on broadcast television.

Rebranding to Fox Sports Southeast

On August 24, 2015, Fox announced that SportSouth would be rebranded as Fox Sports Southeast. The name change took effect six weeks later on its target date of October 5.

Fox Sports Networks senior vice president and general manager Jeff Genthner felt that the re-branding of FSN South as Fox Sports South may have caused viewer confusion due to the similar names. Consumer research conducted in the Charlotte, Memphis and Atlanta markets found that viewers were confused about the autonomy of Fox Sports South and SportSouth, the latter network's relation to the Fox Sports regional networks, and perceived that Fox Sports South had better programming. Network management reportedly had been considering a name change for the channel since 2012, including the use of a numerical brand for SportSouth (similar to that used by national sister networks Fox Sports 1 and Fox Sports 2), and color-code branding (with the main network as "Fox Sports South Red" and the secondary network as "Fox Sports South Blue").

New ownership, rebranding to Bally Sports
On August 22, 2019, the Fox Sports Networks were sold to Sinclair Broadcast Group and Entertainment Studios via the joint venture Diamond Sports Group. Fox divested its regional sports networks under antitrust grounds as part of the acquisition of 21st Century Fox by The Walt Disney Company.

On March 31, 2021, the channel, along with all other FSN channels, was rebranded under the new Bally Sports brand.

On March 14, 2023, Diamond Sports filed for Chapter 11 Bankruptcy.

Programming

Bally Sports Southeast and Bally Sports South hold the exclusive regional cable television rights to the Atlanta Braves Major League Baseball franchise; the Atlanta Hawks, Charlotte Hornets and Memphis Grizzlies of the NBA; the Atlanta Dream of the WNBA; the Carolina Hurricanes and Nashville Predators of the NHL, and Atlanta United FC of Major League Soccer. It also provides coverage of collegiate sports events from the University of Tennessee, and nationally televised games from the Atlantic Coast Conference distributed by Raycom Sports.

Bally Sports Southeast mainly airs programs of regional interest. As such, Bally Sports South exclusively carries national games distributed by Bally Sports from the Big 12 and Pac-12 conferences, while sharing rights to the Southeastern Conference and Atlantic Coast Conference with Bally Sports Southeast. Both Bally Sports South and Bally Sports Southeast balance their own respective schedules of game telecasts from the latter two collegiate conferences, which are selected based on regional versus national interests. Although the two networks share rights to most major professional league teams, Bally Sports South holds exclusive regional rights to NHL games from the Carolina Hurricanes and Nashville Predators; Bally Sports South also covers a somewhat wider broadcast area than Bally Sports Southeast.

Teams by Media Market

Note: In Kentucky, most of North Carolina, and parts of Mississippi, Bally Sports Southeast is not available. In these areas all games are shown on Bally Sports South or an alternate channel.

On-air staff

Commentators

Atlanta Hawks
 Bob Rathbun – play-by-play announcer
 Dominique Wilkins – analyst
 Lauren Jbara – sideline reporter 
 Kelly Crull – Hawks Live pre-game and post-game host
 Jerome Jurenovich – Hawks Live fill-in pre-game and post-game host
 Brian Oliver  – Hawks Live analyst
 Mike Glenn – Hawks Live analyst (select telecasts)
 Renee Montgomery – Hawks Live analyst (select telecasts)
 Vince Carter - analyst (select games) and Hawks Live fill-in pre-game and post-game host

Atlanta Braves
 Brandon Gaudin – play-by-play announcer
 Jeff Francoeur – analyst
 Paul Byrd – analyst / reporter
 Treavor Scales – Braves Live pre-game and post-game host
 Brian Jordan – Braves Live analyst
 Nick Green – Braves Live analyst
 Peter Moylan – Braves Live analyst
 Kelly Crull - reporter / Braves Live fill-in pre-game and post-game host

Charlotte Hornets
 Eric Collins – play-by-play announcer
 Dell Curry – analyst
 Ashley ShahAhmadi – in-game reporter / Hornets Live pre-game and post-game host
 Gerald Henderson Jr. – Hornets Live analyst

Memphis Grizzlies
 Pete Pranica – play-by-play announcer 
 Brevin Knight – analyst
 Rob Fischer – sideline reporter and Grizzlies Live pre-game and post-game host 
 Chris Vernon - Grizzlies Live pre-game and post-game analyst (home games only)

Atlanta Dream
 Angel Gray – play-by-play announcer
 Autumn Johnson – alternate play-by-play announcer
 LaChina Robinson – analyst
 Tabitha Turner – sideline reporter

References

External links
 

Fox Sports Networks
Television channels and stations established in 2006
Companies that filed for Chapter 11 bankruptcy in 2023
2006 establishments in Georgia (U.S. state)
Bally Sports